Tootsie Roll is a chocolate-flavored taffy that has been manufactured in the United States since 1907. The candy has qualities similar to both caramels and taffy without being exactly either confection. The manufacturer, Tootsie Roll Industries, is based in Chicago, Illinois. It was the first penny candy to be individually wrapped in America.

Introduction

According to the official company history, founder Leo Hirschfield (spelled Hirshfield in Tootsie Industries history) was an Austrian Jewish immigrant to the United States of America, son of an Austrian candy maker. He started his own career in the candy business at a small shop or factory located in New York City during 1896. He was employed in a senior position at the Stern & Saalberg company in Manhattan, New York, owned by Julius Stern and Jacob Saalberg, for many years.

Details of his early career are disputed. The more common version has him starting a candy shop in Brooklyn that later merged with Stern & Saalberg. Another version has him starting at the factory and rising to a senior development position.

The first candy that Hirschfield created was Bromangelon Jelly Powder. He completed the invention of Tootsie Rolls in 1907, after patenting a technique to give them their unique texture. He named the candy after his daughter Clara, whose nickname was "Tootsie". The first Tootsie Rolls were marketed commercially in September 1908. Hirschfeld became vice-president of the company, which changed its name to Sweets Company of America in 1917 around the time of the retirement of founders Stern and Saalberg.  Hirschfield resigned or was fired in 1920, and subsequently started Mells Candy. On January 14, 1922, in his room at the Monterey Hotel in Manhattan, he shot himself dead, leaving a note saying that he was "sorry, but could not help it."

In 1935, the company was in serious difficulty. Tootsie Roll's principal supplier of paper boxes, Joseph Rubin & Sons of Brooklyn, concerned about the possible loss of an important customer, decided to acquire the troubled company. The company was listed on the New York Stock Exchange, but Bernard D. Rubin acquired a list of shareholders and approached them in person in order to purchase their shares. The Rubin family eventually achieved control of Tootsie Roll and agreed that Bernard Rubin would run the company as president. Under his leadership, the company was able to steadily increase sales and restore profits by changing the formula of the Tootsie Roll and increasing its size. Additionally, Rubin moved the company from Manhattan to a much larger plant in Hoboken, New Jersey, and guided the company successfully through the difficult war years during which vital raw materials were in short supply. When he died in 1948, he had increased the sales volume twelve-fold.

After Bernard Rubin's death, his brother William B. Rubin served as president until 1962, when William's daughter Ellen Rubin Gordon took control. As of August 2015, she is chairman and CEO of the company, having succeeded her late husband, Melvin Gordon, who was chairman and CEO for many years.

Tootsie Roll Industries (name adopted in 1966) is one of the largest candy manufacturers in the world. Approximately 64 million Tootsie Rolls are made daily.

According to the company website, the original recipe calls for the inclusion of the previous day's batch, "a graining process that Tootsie continues to this day. As such, there's (theoretically) a bit of Leo's very first Tootsie Roll in every one of the sixty four million Tootsie Rolls that Tootsie produces each day."

Advertisements

Tootsie Roll Hero
Captain Tootsie is an advertisement comic strip created for Tootsie Rolls in 1943 by C C Beck, Peter Costanza and Bill Schreider (1950 onwards). It featured the title character Captain Tootsie and his sidekick, a boy named Rollo (a black-haired boy), and three other young cohorts named Fatso (a red-haired boy), Fisty (a blonde boy), and Sweetie (a blonde-haired girl). It had stories in the form of full color one-page Sunday strips, black and white daily strips, and two issues of a comic book of the same title released by Toby Press. The advertisement comic was featured by many publishers and in the newspapers. Within the context of the stories, Captain Tootsie was quite strong and quicker to the punch than any of his enemies. His stories were light and "kid-friendly". Captain Tootsie's comic strip ads ended in the 1950s.

In the 1970s, artist Herb Trimpe is believed to have modeled the original costume for the Marvel Comics character Doc Samson partly on Captain Tootsie's uniform. In 2019, artist/writer Erik Larsen used Captain Tootsie as one of several older comic book characters in the public domain as part of his Savage Dragon series.

Jingle
The Tootsie Roll jingle, "Whatever It Is I Think I See", was recorded at Blank Tape Studios, New York in 1976. Elements of this ad can occasionally be seen today during advertised children's programming. It aired on television regularly for more than 20 years, mostly during Saturday morning cartoon programming. The jingle was sung by a nine-year-old, Rebecca J. Weinstein, and 13-year-old David Johnson, the children of jazz musicians and friends of the song's composer. Originally David was to sing the solo "Whatever it is I think I see becomes a Tootsie Roll to me", but his voice was changing and cracked on the high notes, and so, the solo was given to Rebecca. Rebecca still has the original reel-to-reel audio tape recording.

Ingredients
The current U.S. ingredients of a Tootsie Roll are: sugar, corn syrup, palm oil, condensed skim milk, cocoa, whey, soy lecithin, and artificial and natural flavors.

In 2009, Tootsie Rolls became certified kosher by the Orthodox Union.

Alternative flavors
In addition to the traditional cocoa-flavored Tootsie Roll, several additional flavors have been introduced. Known as Tootsie Fruit Chews, flavors include cherry, orange, vanilla, lemon, and lime. These varieties are wrapped in red, orange, blue, yellow, and green wrappers, respectively. They also offer a special Mega Mix bag that includes specialty flavors, green apple, blue raspberry, and grape. The specialty Fruit Chews are wrapped in dark green, dark blue, and purple to corollate with their flavors. Tootsie Frooties come in numerous different fruit flavors, including strawberry, blue raspberry, grape, green apple, banana berry, smooth cherry, fruit punch, pink lemonade, root beer, cranberry, blueberry, watermelon, and the newest, mango.

See also
 List of confectionery brands

References

External links
 
 Tootsie Roll Tragedy: The Real Leo Hirschfeld Story

Brand name confectionery
Tootsie Roll Industries brands
Products introduced in 1907
Kosher food
Candy bars